Jason Larway (born March 23, 1970) is an American curler from Lynnwood, Washington.

Larway instead attempted to earn a spot at the Trials through the National Olympic Qualifier, which he gained entry to through the Washington State Regional Qualifier. But he had to miss the National Qualifier because it occurred at the same time as the 2001 World Men's Championship. Larway, with fellow curler Rich Ruohonen acting as his attorney, filed a grievance with the United States Olympic Committee and the United States Curling Association asking to be admitted to the Olympic Trials. Through an arbitration process he was eventually offered and accepted an extra, seventh spot at the Olympic Trials.

Awards
USA Curling Male Athlete of the Year: 2001.

Teams

Men's

Mixed

Personal life
His brother Joel is also a curler and the two brothers played together for many years. Larway graduated from University of Washington.

References

External links
 
 

1970 births
Living people
American male curlers
American curling champions
Continental Cup of Curling participants
People from Lynnwood, Washington
Sportspeople from the Seattle metropolitan area
20th-century American people
21st-century American people